Veszprém was an administrative county (comitatus) of the Kingdom of Hungary. Its territory, which was smaller than that of present Veszprém county, in western Hungary. The capital of the county was Veszprém.

Geography
Veszprém county shared borders with the Hungarian counties Vas, Sopron, Győr, Komárom, Fejér, Tolna, Somogy and Zala. It covered the Bakony hills, the eastern tip of Lake Balaton and the region southeast of the lake. The river Marcal formed its western border. Its area was 3953 km² around 1910.

History
Veszprém county arose as one of the first comitatuses of the Kingdom of Hungary, in the 11th century.

The city Siófok, which used to be in Somogy county before the 1850s, went back from Veszprém county to Somogy county before World War II. After World War II, the territory of Veszprém county was again modified: a small region west of Pápa, which used to be part of Vas county, and the northern shore of Lake Balaton, which used to be part of Zala county, were added. The region south-east of Lake Balaton (around Enying) went to Fejér county.

Demographics

1900
In 1900, the county had a population of 222,024 people and was composed of the following linguistic communities:

Total:

 Hungarian: 187,160 (84,3%)
 German: 32,522 (14,6%)
 Slovak: 1,758 (0,8%)
 Romanian: 121 (0,1%)
 Croatian: 35 (0,0%)
 Serbian: 4 (0,0%)
 Ruthenian: 2 (0,0%)
 Other or unknown: 422 (0,2%)

According to the census of 1900, the county was composed of the following religious communities:

Total:

 Roman Catholic: 143,192 (64,5%)
 Calvinist: 44,820 (20,2%)
 Lutheran: 24,393 (11,0%)
 Jewish: 9,343 (4,2%)
 Greek Catholic: 78 (0,0%)
 Greek Orthodox: 98 (0,1%)
 Unitarian: 52 (0,0%)
 Other or unknown: 48 (0,0%)

1910

In 1910, the county had a population of 229,776 people and was composed of the following linguistic communities:

Total:

 Hungarian: 199,063 (86.63%)
 German: 29,283 (12.74%)
 Slovak: 917 (0.4%)
 Croatian: 55 (0.02%)
 Romanian: 41 (0.02%)
 Serbian: 17 (0.01%)
 Ruthenian: 5 (0.0%)
 Other or unknown: 395 (0.17%)

According to the census of 1910, the county was composed of the following religious communities:

Total:

 Roman Catholic: 151,831 (66.08%)
 Calvinist: 44,507 (19.37%)
 Lutheran: 24,905 (10.84%)
 Jewish: 8,282 (3.6%)
 Greek Catholic: 106 (0.05%)
 Greek Orthodox: 61 (0.03%)
 Unitarian: 57 (0.02%)
 Other or unknown: 27 (0.01%)

Subdivisions
In the early 20th century, the subdivisions of Veszprém county were:

References

Counties in the Kingdom of Hungary